Fugitive Rage (also known as Caged Fear) is a 1996 crime drama action film directed by Fred Olen Ray and starring Shauna O'Brien, Jay Richardson and Alexander Keith, credited as Wendy Schumacher. The film was released straight to video in 1996.

Plot

Tara McCormick is sent to prison for the attempted murder of a local drug lord named Tommy Stompanato. Inside, she befriends Josie and is approached by an agent of the government to finish the job she started in exchange for her freedom.

Cast
 Shauna O'Brien as Josie Williams
 Alexander Keith (credited as Wendy Schumacher) as Tara McCormick
 Jay Richardson as Tommy Stompanato
 Ross Hagen as Ryker
 Tim Abell as James O'Keefe
 Toni Naples as Helga
 Katherine Victor as Miss Prince
 Johnny Vincent as Farino
 Rick Montana as DeLuca
 Calista Carradine as Sharrisse
 Nikki Fritz as Wendy, The Nurse

Reception

TV Guide gave the film one star out of four, stating "Fugitive Rage is an utter fantasy, and a bad one at that."

References

External links
 
 

Direct-to-video thriller films
1996 direct-to-video films
1996 films
American crime thriller films
1996 crime thriller films
Films directed by Fred Olen Ray
1990s English-language films
1990s American films